Jevon Crudup (born April 27, 1972) is an American former professional basketball player and coach. After playing college basketball at the University of Missouri, Crudup was drafted by the Detroit Pistons in the 1994 NBA draft. 
During his senior year, Crudup helped lead Missouri to the Elite Eight, tying the school's deepest NCAA Tournament run ever. However, shortly after that season, Missouri discovered that Crudup had accepted thousands of dollars in inducements from a middleman working for agents hoping to sign Crudup if he was selected in the 1994 NBA draft. Missouri didn't dispute that Crudup had received the payments, but contended that it didn't know about them. In 1996, the NCAA largely exonerated Missouri, but forced the Tigers to vacate their 1994 NCAA Tournament appearance.

He coached at his alma mater, Raytown South High School, and in 2006, won a wrongful termination judgement in a discrimination lawsuit against the school after he was fired over a post-game incident.

References

External links
College statistics at the Draft Review

1972 births
Living people
Basketball coaches from Missouri
Basketball players from Kansas City, Missouri
Connecticut Pride players
Detroit Pistons draft picks
Florida Beachdogs players
Forwards (basketball)
High school basketball coaches in Missouri
Missouri Tigers men's basketball players
Parade High School All-Americans (boys' basketball)
San Diego Wildfire players
Sportspeople from Kansas City, Missouri
American men's basketball players
American expatriate basketball people in the Philippines
Philippine Basketball Association imports
Pop Cola Panthers players